Smoke Signals is an album by the hardcore punk band MDC. The original vinyl release appeared on the band's own Radical Records label in 1986. It was finally reissued on CD in 2001 on the We Bite label and distributed by Plastic Head. The album finds the band moving in musical directions outside of hardcore, with some tracks featuring hints of classic and progressive rock sounds, but it is still largely a punk rock album featuring the band's typically tight, fast musicianship. Lyrics focus on sociopolitical themes typical of punk rock at the time, including sentiments critical of the government and of South African apartheid. One of the band's more humorous songs, "Country Squawk" espouses a pro-vegetarian view over fast, twangy country-western musical backing.

Track listing

Side One
 "No More Cops"
 "King of Thrash"
 "Drink to Forget"
 "The Big Picture"
 "Skateboards from Hell"
 "Tofutti"
 "South Africa Is Free"

Side Two
 "Acceptable Risks"
 "Missile Destroyed Civilization"
 "Soup Kitchen Celebrity"
 "Country Squawk"
 "Paradise Lost"
 "Smoke Signals"

Personnel
Dave Dictor - lead vocals
Gordon Fraser - guitar
Franco Mares - bass guitar
Al Schvitz - drums

with help from:
Joe (CFA) Rock - bass on "No More Cops", "King of Thrash", "The Big Picture" and "Skateboards From Hell"
Ex Con Ron [Ron Posner] - guitar on "Acceptable Risks", "No More Cops", "King of Thrash", "The Big Picture" and "Skateboards From Hell"
Dave Dick - acoustic guitar on "Country Squawk"
Tom Albino - guitar on "Missile Destroyed Civilization"

Notes
"Tofutti" is a tribute to non-dairy ice cream brand Tofutti written by Dave Dictor, a strict vegetarian, sung to the tune of "Tooti Fruity" by Little Richard.
"Country Squawk" is a new recording of "Chicken Squawk" from the band's Millions of Dead Children 7-inch EP.
The title track was the band's first recorded and released instrumental.

The song "Big Picture" is a cover of a Subhumans song.

1986 albums
MDC (band) albums